A Gold souk is a gold market in Arab countries of Arabian Peninsula and particularly in GCC countries. The word souk is mostly used by Arabs for open markets. The term evolved through the expatriates settled in Gulf Cooperation Council countries, and spread to other Asian and western parts due to the growing numbers of expatriates in GCC countries. The term is often used to refer to the gold market in Arabized or Muslim cities, but also appears in Western and Asian cities.

The world's largest indoor gold souk is located at Dubai Mall, Dubai, UAE.

Gallery

See also

 Dubai Gold Souk
 Bazaar

References

Retailers by type of merchandise sold
Arabic words and phrases

Gold
Arab culture